Love Finds You in Valentine is a 2016 American TV romantic drama film directed by Terry Cunningham. The film stars Michaela McManus and Diogo Morgado in the lead roles. The film was released on February 14, 2016, coinciding with the Valentine's Day.

Synopsis 
Kennedy (Michaela McManus) travels up to the small town of Valentine Nebraska to sell a ranch that she's inherited, but first wants to spend the summer in the home to discover more about her family history.

Cast 
 Michaela McManus as Kennedy Blaine
 Diogo Morgado as Derek Sterling
 Hunter Cross as Steve
 James Kisicki as Gregory Talbot
 Lindsay Wagner as June Sterling
 Danny Rios as Ray Lazaro
 Brian Bartels as Pastor Morgan
 Ed Asner as Gabriel Morgan

References

External links 
 

2016 romantic drama films
American romantic drama films
2010s television films
2016 films
American drama television films
2010s English-language films
2010s American films